Arthur Wragg (3 January 1903 – 17 August 1976) was a British illustrator.

His stark poster-like artwork often dealt with themes of social alienation and spiritual emptiness. All his work was done for publication, rather than in 'fine art' media such as paintings or series of prints. As a result, he has been neglected in comparison with contemporaries such as Graham Sutherland and John Piper, but Wragg's choice of medium was an ideological one. As a socialist and pacifist, Wragg wanted his art to speak directly to common people rather than to art-lovers. His vivid, polemical style had considerable influence on other popular forms in the 1940s and 1950s, such as government information posters and advertising.

He was born in Eccles, Greater Manchester, and grew up in Harrogate, Yorkshire, along with his sister Amy Wragg, born 1898. He was the son of George Arthur Wragg (a travelling soap salesman for Lively Polly) from Sheffield, Yorkshire, and Alice Smethurst Eckersley (a telegraphist) from Salford, Lancashire (a member of the prominent Williamson family of Salford). He trained at Sheffield School of Art before settling in London as a  freelance commercial artist, in which capacity he was in continuous demand for the rest of his life. In the 1920s he contributed mostly to various women's illustrated magazines, but later branched out into book-jackets and work for left-wing newspapers such as Tribune and Peace News (including cartoons) and illustrations for books and pamphlets about Christian socialism, pacifism and social justice.

Out of this more committed range of work, and out of the social issues raised by the Great Depression of the 1930s, came several books in which Wragg illustrated biblical texts in a politicised way, notably The Psalms for Modern Life (Selwyn & Blount 1933) which went through several reprints. The simplified block-style and dramatic chiaroscuro effects of these illustrations make them resemble woodcuts rather than pen and ink drawings (misleading some collectors into thinking the books are just reissues of hand-printed original editions) and there are many affinities with the visual-symbolic language of propaganda art, although Wragg's agenda is more generalised. Social realities and symbols are blended to convey deprivation, justice, conscience, and the persistence of spiritual values in the alienated urban-industrial environment.

A friend and follower of the popular pacifist preacher Canon Dick Sheppard, Wragg became a sponsor of the Peace Pledge Union and was a conscientious objector during World War II. After imprisonment, he became an art-teacher in schools, returning to freelance work after the war. His personal style became more airy and more fantastical, and sometimes surreal.

From 1953 until his death he produced illustrations for record covers for the Argo record company.

As yet there is no catalogue of his work but there is a book about the artist: Arthur Wragg: Twentieth-century Prophet and Jester (Sansom 2001) by the late Judith Brook, who had been taught art by him at school.  Early in his career he featured as the 'Artist of Note' in the long-running magazine The Artist (Vol XI No 5, July 1936).

Some books illustrated by Arthur Wragg

The Psalms for Modern Life (Selwyn & Blount 1933)
Jesus Wept (Selwyn & Blount 1935)
Holt - When I was a Prisoner (Miles 1935) 
Darling, William - Down But Not Out (George Allen & Unwin 1935)
Szekely - Cosmos, Man and Society (Daniel 1936)
Walter Greenwood - The Cleft Stick (Selwyn & Blount 1937)
Thy Kingdom Come (Selwyn & Blount 1939)
Seven Words (Heinemann 1939)
Alice through the paper-mill: In Respectful Criticism of the Paper Control and Kindred Matters relating to the Present State of the Trade. A Plea for an Equitable System of Planning whereby to ensure a Measure of Efficiency and a Degree of Order for All Concerned.
The Lord's Prayer in Black and White (Cape 1946)
Wilde - The Ballad of Reading Gaol (Castle Press 1948) 
Purcell - These thy Gods (Longman 1949)
The Song of Songs (Selwyn & Blount 1952)
 Flaubert, G.  "Bibliomania" (Rodale, 1954)
Willis - Whatever Happened to Tom Mix (Cassell 1970)

Obituary 
 The Times, 25 August 1976, JMH [John M Hobbs]

External links

References

1903 births
1976 deaths
British conscientious objectors
British illustrators
British socialists
People from Eccles, Greater Manchester
People from Harrogate